RC Zlín is a Czech rugby club in Zlín. They currently play in the KB Extraliga.

History
The club was founded in 1944.

In 1982 they undertook a tour to France, paying a visit to the grave of William Webb Ellis in Menton and winning a sevens tournament in Montpellier.

Historical names
 SK Bat'a Zlín (1947)
 ZK Bat'a Zlín (1948)
 Sokol Borostroj Zlín (1948)
 Sokol Svit (1949)
 Jiskra Gottwaldov (1953) 
 Spartak Gottwaldov (1953) 
 TJ Gottwaldov (1958)
 SK Zlín (1990)
 RC Zlín (1993)

External links
RC Zlín
 80 let Českého Ragby (80 years of Czech Rugby)

Czech rugby union teams
Rugby clubs established in 1944
Sport in Zlín